The 1998 Trofeo Forla de Navarra was the 45th edition of the GP Miguel Induráin cycle race and was held on 3 April 1998. The race was won by Francisco Mancebo.

General classification

References

1998
1998 in Spanish road cycling